Library Genesis (Libgen) is a file-sharing based shadow library website for scholarly journal articles, academic and general-interest books, images, comics, audiobooks, and magazines. The site enables free access to content that is otherwise paywalled or not digitized elsewhere. Libgen describes itself as a "links aggregator", providing a searchable database of items "collected from publicly available public Internet resources" as well as files uploaded "from users".

Libgen provides access to copyrighted works, such as PDFs of content from Elsevier's ScienceDirect web-portal. Publishers like Elsevier have accused Library Genesis of internet piracy. Others assert that academic publishers unfairly benefit from government-funded research, written by researchers, many of whom are employed by public universities, and that Libgen is helping to disseminate research that should be freely available in the first place.

History 
Library Genesis has roots in the illegal underground samizdat culture in the Soviet Union. In a society where access to printing was strictly controlled by heavy-handed censorship, dissident intellectuals hand copied and retyped manuscripts for secret circulation. This was legalized under Soviet general secretary Mikhail Gorbachev in the 1980s, and expanded very rapidly at a time of affordable desktop computers and scanners, and very small research budgets.

The volunteers moved into the Russian computer network ("RuNet") in the 1990s, which became awash with hundreds of thousands of uncoordinated contributions. Librarians became especially active, using borrowed access passwords to download copies of scientific and scholarly articles from Western Internet sources, then uploading them to RuNet.

In the early 21st century, the efforts became coordinated, and integrated into one massive system known as Library Genesis, or LibGen, around 2008. It subsequently absorbed the contents of, and became the functional successor to, library.nu, which was shut down by legal action in 2012. By 2014, its catalog was more than twice the size of library.nu with 1.2 million records.  Library Genesis claims to have more than 2.4 million non-fiction books, 80 million science magazine articles, 2 million comics files, 2.2 million fiction books, and 0.4 million magazine issues.

In 2020, the project was forked under an alternate domain, "libgen.fun", due to internal conflict within the project. As a result, databases are being maintained independently and content differs between libgen.fun and other Libgen domains.

Legal issues

Litigation 
In 2015, Library Genesis became involved in a legal case with Elsevier, which accused it of copyright infringement and granting free access to articles and books. In response, the admins accused Elsevier of gaining most of its profits from publicly funded research which should be freely available to all as they are paid for by taxpayers.

In late October 2015, the District Court for the Southern District of New York ordered Libgen to shut down and to suspend use of the domain name (libgen.org), but the site is accessible through alternate domains.

Hosting country 
Libgen is reported to be registered in both Russia and The Netherlands, making the appropriate jurisdiction for legal action unclear.

Blocks 
Libgen is blocked by a number of ISPs in the United Kingdom, but such DNS-based blocks are claimed to do little to deter access. It is also blocked by ISPs in France, Germany, Greece, Italy, Belgium (which redirects to the Belgian Federal Police blockpage), and Russia (in November 2018).

Usage 
Until the end of 2014, Sci-Hub, which provides free access to millions of research papers and books, relied on LibGen as storage. Papers requested by users were requested from LibGen and served from there if available, otherwise they were fetched by other means and then stored on LibGen.

In 2019 archivists and freedom of information activists launched a project to better seed and host LibGen's data dumps. The project's spokesperson and coordinator 'shrine' described the effort as a way for a "permanent library card for the world" and reported that the response has been "overwhelmingly positive from everyone". In 2020, the project launched a peer-to-peer digital library of content on Sci-Hub and Library Genesis using IPFS.

See also 

 Anna's Archive
 Guerilla Open Access Manifesto
 ICanHazPDF
 Samizdat
 Sci-Hub
 Z-Library

Further reading
 Houle, Louis (2017) Sci-Hub and LibGen: what if… why not? Paper presented at: International Federation of Library Associations and Institutions WLIC 2017 – Wrocław, Poland – Libraries. Solidarity. Society. in Session S12 - Satellite Meeting: Serials and Other Continuing Resources Section and Acquisition and Collection Development. In: Open Access: Action Required, 16 – 17 August 2017, Gdańsk (Poland).

Explanatory notes

References

External links 
 List of mirrors and gateways, including their status.
 

Search engine software
File sharing communities
I2P
Intellectual property activism
Book websites
BitTorrent websites
Russian digital libraries
Shadow libraries